Sete Barras is a municipality in the state of São Paulo in Brazil. The population is 12,780 (2020 est.) in an area of 1063 km². The elevation is 30 m.

The municipality contains part of the  Carlos Botelho State Park, created in 1982.
It contains part of the  Serra do Mar Environmental Protection Area, created in 1984.
It also contains part of the  Intervales State Park, created in 1995.

References

Municipalities in São Paulo (state)